The East Asian hip-and-gable roof (Xiēshān (歇山) in Chinese, Irimoya (入母屋) in Japanese, and Paljakjibung (팔작지붕) in Korean) also known as 'resting hill roof', consists of a hip roof that slopes down on all four sides and integrates a gable on two opposing sides. It is usually constructed with two large sloping roof sections in the front and back respectively, while each of the two sides is usually constructed with a smaller roof section.

The style is Chinese in origin, and has spread across much of East and Continental Asia. The original Chinese style and similar styles are not only found in the traditional architectures of Japan and Korea but also other Continental Asian countries such as India, Vietnam, Mongolia, Tibet, Nepal, Sri Lanka and Kalmykia. It also influenced the style of the bahay na bato of the Philippines.

Etymology

East Asia

Xieshan in China 
In China, the hip-and-gable roof style, also known as the xieshan roof style, originated in the Eastern Han dynasty as an adaptation of the hip roof. It was mainly applied in the construction of palaces, temples, gardens and other buildings with official functions. In contemporary times, it is still widely used in Buddhist and Taoist temples and shrines in China.

The style is generally characterized by the presence of nine ridges and a hipped roof encircled with a peristyle. The nine ridges typically consists of one horizontal ridge on the top, known as the main ridge, which is connected to four vertical ridges and four diagonal ridge. 

There are typically two types of eaves associated with the xieshan style: single eaves (单檐) and double eaves (重檐). Single eaves refer to the edges of a basic xieshan rooftop, while double eaves consist of an additional layer of eaves below the basic xieshan rooftop. Examples of the double eave type can be found on the xieshan roofs of structures such as Cining Palace, the Gate of Supreme Harmony and the Hall of Preserving Harmony in the Forbidden City, as well as the Grand Hotel in Taipei. Examples of the single eave type can be found on buildings such as Zhihua Temple, the shanmen of Miaoying Temple, and the North Gate of the Walls of Taipei.

Irimoya in Japan
Irimoya arrived from China to Japan in the 6th century. The style was originally used in the main and lecture halls of a Buddhist temple compound. It started to be used for the honden at shrines and also in palaces, castles, and folk dwellings later during the Japanese Middle Ages. Its gable is usually right above the moya, or core, while the hip covers the hisashi, a veranda-like aisle surrounding the core on one or more sides.

It is still in wide use in the construction of Buddhist temples and Shinto shrines in Japan. It is also often called . Another variant of Japanese hip-and-gable roof is the Shikorobuki.

South Asia

Kandyan roof of Sri Lanka
In Sri Lanka, a style known as the kandyan roof bears many similarities to the original East Asian hip-and-gable roof. The kandyan roof is primarily used for religious, and historically, royal buildings. Its roots however lie in the traditions of the "Sri Lankan village".

Gallery

See also
Gablet roof

References 

Roofs
Architecture in Taiwan
Chinese architectural styles
Japanese architectural features
East Asian architecture
Architecture in Korea
Shinto architecture